The canton of Obernai is an administrative division of the Bas-Rhin department, northeastern France. Its borders were modified at the French canton reorganisation which came into effect in March 2015. Its seat is in Obernai.

It consists of the following communes:

Andlau
Barr
Bernardswiller
Bernardvillé
Blienschwiller
Bourgheim
Dambach-la-Ville
Eichhoffen
Epfig
Gertwiller
Goxwiller
Heiligenstein
Le Hohwald
Itterswiller
Krautergersheim
Meistratzheim
Mittelbergheim
Niedernai
Nothalten
Obernai
Reichsfeld
Saint-Pierre
Stotzheim
Valff
Zellwiller

References

Cantons of Bas-Rhin